Lowe House may refer to:

Lowe-Forman House, New Orleans, Louisiana, listed on the NRHP in Orleans Parish, Louisiana 
Joshua Lowe House, Rising Sun, Maryland, listed on the NRHP in Cecil County, Maryland 
Cicero Francis Lowe House Winston-Salem, North Carolina, listed on the NRHP in Forsyth County, North Carolina
Martin-Lowe House, Clarendon, Texas, listed on the NRHP in Donley County, Texas
David Lowe House, Cheney, Washington, listed on the NRHP in Spokane County, Washington
Lowe House (San Francisco), 100 32nd Avenue in San Francisco, designed by Joseph Esherick
Church of St Mary, Lowe House, Roman Catholic Parish in St Helens, Merseyside, UK

See also
Low House (disambiguation)